Horace French Graham (February 7, 1862November 23, 1941) was an American politician who served as the 56th governor of Vermont from 1917 to 1919.

Early life
Graham was born in Brooklyn, New York, the son of Samuel Hallett Graham and Lucy Fairbanks (Swett) Graham.  He received his early education in Craftsbury, Vermont, and was a graduate of Craftsbury Academy.  He graduated from the College of the City of New York (now New York University) in 1882.  He received his law degree from Columbia Law School in 1888 and became an attorney in Craftsbury.

Graham was a member of the Phi Gamma Delta fraternity.

Early political career
A Republican, he served as Craftsbury's Town Meeting Moderator from 1902 to 1932, and in the Vermont House of Representatives in 1892 and 1900.  He was Orleans County State's Attorney from 1898 to 1902, and a Republican Presidential elector in 1900.

Graham was Vermont's Auditor from 1902 to 1916, and a member of the state Education Commission in 1913.

Election as Governor
In 1916 Graham was the successful candidate for the Republican nomination for Governor.  In a state where only Republicans won statewide office from the 1850s to the 1960s, he easily won the general election.  He served from 1917 to 1919, the one term then available to Vermont Republicans under the "Mountain Rule."

Graham's governorship was notable for his advocacy of women's suffrage in local elections, and for his efforts to mobilize the Vermont National Guard and other state resources for World War I.

Charges of embezzlement
While Graham was governor, an investigation revealed that a large sum of state money (nearly $25 thousand, or $450 thousand in 2019) was unaccounted for during his term as Auditor.  Graham repaid the missing funds, but was charged with embezzlement and convicted at trial.  He was then pardoned by the new Governor, Percival Clement, who lauded Graham's integrity (his nickname was "Honest Horace") and efforts as Governor during World War I.  Graham always maintained his innocence, but stated that since the loss took place while he was Auditor, he felt personally obligated to reimburse the state for the missing money.

Post gubernatorial career
His reputation for integrity was largely undamaged, and he served in the Vermont House again from 1924 to 1925, and also took part in revising Vermont's Statutes in 1933.

Death and burial

Graham died in Craftsbury on November 23, 1941.  He was buried at Craftsbury Common Cemetery.

Personal
Graham was a lifelong bachelor and lived with his sister Isabel.

References

External resources
 Horace French Graham biography, National Governors Association, accessed November 19, 2011

VT Digger

1862 births
1941 deaths
People from Craftsbury, Vermont
New York University alumni
Columbia Law School alumni
Vermont lawyers
State's attorneys in Vermont
Republican Party governors of Vermont
State Auditors of Vermont
Republican Party members of the Vermont House of Representatives
Vermont politicians convicted of crimes
Burials in Vermont